Kuok Khoon Hong (born  1949) is a Singaporean business magnate, entrepreneur and philanthropist. He is the co-founder, chairman and CEO of Wilmar International, having built it into one of Asia's leading agribusiness groups, and the world's largest palm oil trader. He is also the Chairman of Perennial Real Estate Holdings Ltd. He has an estimated net worth of US$3.7 billion as of Jan 2021.

Career
Kuok earned a Bachelor of Commerce degree from the McGill University in 1973 and began his career trading soft commodities at Kuok Oils and Grains. He eventually became managing director of Kuok Oils and Grains, and developed the Pasir Gudang Edible Oils refining complex in Johor, followed by China's first edible oil refinery, South Seas Oils and Fats.

In 1991, he left the Kuok Group to start Wilmar, with Chinese Indonesian businessman Martua Sitorus soon after coming on board as a co-founder. Starting as a small commodities trading company with S$2m in seed capital from the mortgage of his family home, and further seed funding obtained from Kuok Hock Swee and Sons, his father's investment company. Wilmar grew rapidly from the outset, with initial growth in the Indonesian edible oil market, followed up with development of Sumatran oil palm plantations and Indonesian edible oil refineries. A large expansion into edible oil refining in mainland China, and a joint venture with the Adani Group in India subsequently placed it in leading positions within Asia's largest consumer edible oil markets.

In 2007, after a 16-year estrangement, he agreed with his uncle Robert Kuok to merge the Kuok Group's edible oil, trading and oil palm plantation assets into Wilmar in return for a 31% stake in the company. The merger resulted in the unification of Kuok's previous early career contributions to the Kuok Group with the rapid growth of Wilmar International led by him and Martua Sitorus since 1991.

In 2012, he was elected an Honorary Fellow of Magdalene College, Cambridge University.

In 2019, Kuok received the Chinese Government Friendship Award, the People's Republic of China's highest award for foreigners who have made outstanding contributions to the country's economic and social progress.

Philanthropy
In May 2020, Kuok and his company, Wilmar International, donated SG$7 million to The Straits Times School Pocket Money Fund, as part of Singapore's COVID-19 community relief efforts.

Together with the Wilmar Group, he has set up and funded several schools in Indonesia as well as elderly homes and orphanages in China, the latter having won government recognition for its high quality model of charity operations and governance.

Kuok established the KKH Scholarship at the Singapore Management University and the Singapore University of Technology and Design, as well as the KKH Bursary at Magdalene College of Cambridge University.

Personal life
Kuok was born in the seaside village of Mersing in Johor, Malaysia, the second of four children of Kuok Hock Swee and Tan Sek Meng. His father was an elder cousin of Malaysian Chinese billionaire Robert Kuok. He was educated at Sri Mersing Primary, St Joseph's School and the English College, Johor Bahru.

His father, Kuok Hock Swee, had arrived in then British Malaya from Fuzhou in Southern China at the age of 18. He eventually set up a provision store in Mersing, which he expanded into a thriving business distributing foodstuffs along the east coast of Peninsula Malaysia. This was subsequently merged for an equity stake in Robert Kuok's rapidly expanding Kuok Group, which by then already included the first Shangri-La Hotel in Singapore.

The Kuok family traces its ancestry to the 8th century Tang Dynasty patriot and general Guo Ziyi, the commander of the Tang army who crushed the rebellion of An Lushan.

Kuok is married with four children - 3 sons and 1 daughter. His eldest son, Kuok Meng Han, is a biotech entrepreneur and the founder of Camtech. His second son, Kuok Meng Ru, was an amateur singer/songwriter before co-founding the popular social music creation platform BandLab Technologies.

References

1951 births
Living people
Malaysian people of Chinese descent
Singaporean people of Chinese descent
Singaporean billionaires
People from Johor
Malaysian emigrants to Singapore
McGill University Faculty of Management alumni
Singaporean chairpersons of corporations